Alastair Fyfe (born 6 April 1960) is a Scottish-English-Saudi Arabian male curler and curling coach.

At the national level, he is a three-time English senior men's champion curler (2014, 2016, 2018).

As of November 2021, he is a Secretary of Saudi Winter Sports Federation.

Teams

Record as a coach of national teams

References

External links

Living people
1960 births
English male curlers
English curling champions
English curling coaches
Place of birth missing (living people)
Saudi Arabian sportsmen
Scottish expatriate sportspeople